Surfrider is a steel shuttle roller coaster at Wet'n'Wild Gold Coast located at Oxenford, Gold Coast, Australia. The ride is an Intamin Half Pipe roller coaster that opened in September 2007. It has stood but not operated since 2020.

History
In February 2007, roller coaster parts began arriving in Wet'n'Wild Gold Coast's car park. The Gold Coast Bulletin later reported the ride as being an Intamin Half Pipe roller coaster with an opening date scheduled for the September school holidays. In late April, Wet'n'Wild Gold Coast officially confirmed this report by announcing the Surfrider. After a relatively short construction period, the ride was fully assembled by July 2007. The ride opened in September 2007.

Surfrider was originally planned to be installed at Sea World, a theme park owned by the same company as Wet'n'Wild Gold Coast, Village Roadshow Theme Parks. After purchasing the ride from Intamin, the location where it was to be installed was changed.

The ride has stood but not operated since 2020.

Ride
Riders are placed in one of two cars on the train which is made to resemble a giant surfboard. Each car is a free-spinning circle that holds six people. The track is essentially a giant, upright U and trains are loaded at the bottom of the U. Linear synchronous motors accelerate the train up both sides of the track. A typical ride lasts for approximately 1 minute.

Several water features were originally included to simulate riding a wave but these are no longer in use.

Surfrider is listed as a seasonal attraction and does not operate in the winter months.

See also
 Avatar Airbender, a similar ride at Nickelodeon Universe
 RC Racer, a similar ride at several Disney parks

References

External links
 
 

Roller coasters introduced in 2007
Roller coasters in Australia
Roller coasters operated by Village Roadshow Theme Parks